John Ewers may refer to:

John C. Ewers (1909–1997), American ethnologist and museum curator
John K. Ewers (1904–1978), Australian writer
John R. Ewers, United States Marine Corps general